Hippolochus may refer to:

 Hippolochus (writer), Macedonian writer, student of Theophrastus
 Hippolochus (mythology), figure from Greek mythology